Gakowzheh, also rendered as Kakowzheh, may refer to:
 Gakowzheh-ye Olya
 Gakowzheh-ye Sofla